Taxi is a series of French comedy films, created by screenwriter and producer Luc Besson, consisting of five films primarily set in Marseille. In addition, an American-French remake of the 1998 original was made in 2004 and titled Taxi. In 2014 an American-French TV series called Taxi Brooklyn also aired.

Films

Original series

Taxi (1998)

Taxi was shot in 1998 by Gérard Pirès based on the script by Luc Besson. It tells the story of the young taxi driver Daniel, who loves risk and high speeds, and clumsy policeman Émilien who team up to catch a German gang of bank robbers. In the end, thanks to Daniel's ingenuity, they succeed. The movie earned $44.4 million at the box office with a budget of $8.1 million.

Taxi 2 (2000)

In 2000, director Gérard Krawczyk filmed the sequel. The scriptwriter and producer of the picture was Luc Besson. At the heart of the story lies the confrontation between Daniel and Émilien about the kidnapping of the Japanese minister of defense who arrived in Marseille to get acquainted with France's achievements in the fight against terrorists. The movie earned $64.4 million at the box office with a budget of €10.7 million.

Taxi 3 (2003)

In 2003 Taxi 3 was released. The director was again Gérard Krawczyk, with Luc Besson still being producer and script writer. Daniel and Émilien reunite once again to fight a gang of bank robbers disguised as Santa Claus. The movie earned $64.5 million at the box office with a budget of €14.5 million.

Taxi 4 (2007)

On February 14, 2007, the premiere of the film Taxi 4 was held in France. As in the two previous movies, the director was Gerard Krawczyk, and Luc Besson was scriptwriter and producer. The most dangerous criminal in the world, Albert van den Bosch, escapes from the Marseille police station because of Émilien's incapability. As a result of this, Émilien is dismissed and is now working with Daniel and his wife Petra trying to track down and arrest the escaped criminal. The movie raised more than $65 million at the box office with a budget of €17.3 million.

Taxi 5 (2018)

Taxi 5 premiered in theaters on April 12, 2018. As before, the scriptwriter and producer was Luc Besson, while Gerard Krawczyk was replaced by the young director Franck Gastambide. The characters were also changed, instead of Daniel and Émilien, the heroes of the movie are Daniel's nephew Eddie Makhlouf and the Parisian police officer Silvain Maro, transferred to Marseille. They have to catch a gang of Italian robbers who use Italian supercars as their getaway vehicles. The movie earned $42 million at the box office with a budget of €20.39 million.

Remake

Taxi (2004)

The success of the series of films Taxi attracted the attention of Hollywood. In 2004, Luc Besson's studio EuropaCorp and the American 20th Century Fox jointly shot a remake of the first Taxi, keeping the same title.

Belle Williams is the fastest taxi driver of New York and dreams of competing in NASCAR. But instead of racing, she has to team up with police officer Andy Washburn, a dimwitted detective and an inept driver. Together, they pursue a gang of bank robbers led by Vanessa – a cold and prudent beauty.

The film turned out to be financially profitable, grossing nearly $69 million worldwide with a budget of $25 million but received negative reviews on Rotten Tomatoes with a rating of 10%.

Future
In an interview with “50 Minutes Inside,” Franck Gastambide announced that if Taxi 5 pays off well at the box office, then Taxi 6 will be his next job. Unfortunately, the film failed at the box office with a budget of €20.39 million, raising only $35 million. Despite this, the director still plans to make the sixth film.

In an interview with the Premiere newspaper, Samy Naceri said that he was ready to star in Taxi 6 if Luc Besson “assembled the old team”, he refused to only appear as a cameo.

At the Dinar Film Festival of 2018, Sabrina Ouazani confirmed that the sixth film is still in planning stage, further details are currently unknown.

Television

Taxi Brooklyn (2014)

In 2014, the television series Taxi Brooklyn, filmed jointly by EuropaCorp Television, the French TV channel TF1 and the American NBC, aired on television. The main creator of the series was Gary Scott Thompson. The plot was based on the first "Taxi".

Caitlin "Cat" Sullivan is an NYPD detective working in Brooklyn. After her driving privileges are suspended, she relies on Leo Romba, a Brooklyn cab driver from France. Leo becomes Cat's driver and a de facto consultant on her cases. While solving crimes with Leo, Cat is also running her own unauthorized investigation into the death of her father, an NYPD detective thought to have been executed by the Capella crime family. In doing so, she clashes with her boss, Captain Baker, and her ex-husband Gregg, who has picked up the case for the FBI.

On the site Rotten Tomatoes, the series received a rating of 38%. On March 6, 2015, NBC cancelled the show.

Cast and crew

Principal cast 
 This table shows the characters and the actors who have portrayed them throughout the franchise
 Italics indicate the actor only appears in flashbacks via archive footage from previous films
 A dark grey cell indicates the character was not in the film

Additional crew

Reception

Box office performance

Music

Soundtracks 
 Taxi: Original Motion Picture Soundtrack 1998
 Taxi 2: Original Motion Picture Soundtrack 2000
 Taxi 3: Original Motion Picture Soundtrack 2003
 Taxi: Original Motion Picture Soundtrack 2004
 Taxi 4: Original Motion Picture Soundtrack 2007
 Taxi 5: Original Motion Picture Soundtrack 2018

Other media

Video games 
Taxi 2 – Based on Taxi 2. Released in 2000.
Taxi 3 – Based on Taxi 3. Released in 2003.

References 

 
French comedy films
French-language films
Film series introduced in 1998